Dom Antoine Rivet de La Grange (Confolens, 1683 - Le Mans, 1749) was a French benedictine monk and supporter of Jansenism.

He was opposed to the Unigenitus papal bull and, because he was Jansenist, his superiors sent him to the Abbey of St. Vincent in Le Mans, where he spent the last thirty years of his life.

Dom Rivet finished the Nécrologe de Port-Royal des Champs (1723) and edited the first nine volumes of the Histoire littéraire de la France (1733–49), which was continued by François Clément and later by the French Académie des Inscriptions et Belles-Lettres.

References

Marie-Nicolas Bouillet et Alexis Chassang (ed.), "Antoine Rivet de La Grange", in Dictionnaire universel d’histoire et de géographie, 1878 (Wikisource)

1683 births
1749 deaths
18th-century French historians
French Benedictines
18th-century French writers
18th-century French male writers
Jansenists